A number of religious figures in Brittany have contributed to its history.

The Seven Founder Saints of Brittany
Each of the Seven Founder Saints was eventually ordained bishop. The only native Breton was St Tudwal. The other founders came from Wales, Ireland and Cornwall. 
 St. Tudwal – traditionally the son of King Hoel I and cousin of the King of Domnonée; made Bishop at insistence of Childebert
 St. Pol – created Bishop by Childebert; student of Saint Illtud
 St. Brieuc – student of Saint Germanus of Auxerre
 St. Malo – disciple of Saint Brendan
 St. Padarn – a friend of Saint David; made Bishop by the Patriarch of Jerusalem; his life story evidence of the existence of King Arthur
 St. Corentin of Quimper – first bishop of Quimper
 St. Samson of Dol – student of Saint Illtud; ordained Bishop by Bishop Dubricius

Monasteries of Brittany
Mont Saint-Michel - lost to Normandy when conquered by William I, Duke of Normandy
 Monastery of St. John at Gaël
 Monastery of Paimpont

Other Saints and other Holy Persons
St Yves - Ivo of Kermartin - patron saint of lawyers
Saint Darerca of Ireland - Saint (recognized), Queen of Brittany
Saint Salomon - Saint (by tradition), King of Brittany
Saint Judicael - son of a Hoel; King of Domnonia & then Brittany; declared a saint at death
Saint Armel - dragonslayer; a son of a Hoel; Breton prince of the 6th century.
Saint Méen- Abbott
Saint Austol - an associate of Saint Meen
Saint Judoc- never canonized; by tradition, son of Saint Judicael; renounced the Breton Crown to live as a hermit
Saint Winnoc- Abbott of Wormhout in Wales, by tradition, son of Saint Judicael
Saint Louis de Montfort - Saint; canonized in 1947
The Blessed Charles de Blois - once canonized a saint, Pope Leo set this aside at the request of John V Duke of Brittany; beatified in 1904
The Blessed Julian Maunoir - beatified in 1951

Bishops and Dioceses
Ancient Metropolitan of Tours - Archbishop of Tours - Archdiocese of Tours - All Breton Dioceses were subordinate to Tours until Rennes was raised to an archdiocese. The Duke of Brittany attempted to make Dol the archdiocese in charge of Breton Dioceses, but this was rebuffed by Rome in favor of Tours, and eventually the Diocese of Dol ceased to be an archdiocese.
Ancient Archbishop of Dol - The Ancient Diocese of Dol reached the peak of its ecclesiastical powers around the 10th century, but lost the privileges of an archdiocese. The Bishop ceased to use the title archbishop in the 1700s. The diocese was subsequently split between the Archdiocese of Rennes and the Diocese of St. Brieuc and Treguier.
Archbishop of Rennes - Held the privilege of crowning the new Duke of Brittany. Currently the highest-ranking dioceses within the Roman Catholic Church's organization for Brittany. The archdiocese has 8 suffragans: Outside of Brittany: Diocese of Angers, Diocese of Laval, Diocese of Le Mans, Diocese of Luçon; Within Brittany: Diocese of Nantes, Diocese of Quimper, the Diocese of Saint-Brieuc and Treguier, and the Diocese of Vannes.
Ancient Bishop of Kerne - Diocese of Kerne (Diocese of Cournouaille);merged into Dioceses of Quimper
Ancient Bishop of Saint-Brieuc for the Ancient Diocese of Saint-Brieuc; merged into the modern diocese of Saint-Brieuc and Tréguier
Ancient Bishop of St Pol de Leon - Diocese of Saint-Pol-de-Leon- merged into the modern Diocese of Quimper
Ancient Bishop of St. Malo - Ancient Diocese of Saint-Malo also known as the Diocese of Poutrocoet; divided amongst the modern Dioceses of Rennes, St Brieuc and Trequier, and Vannes.
Ancient Bishop of Treguier - Diocese of Treguier; parts are merged into the modern diocese of Saint-Brieuc and Tréguier and the modern Diocese of Quimper
Bishop of Nantes - Diocese of Nantes
Bishop of Quimper - Diocese of Quimper (Formerly part of the Diocese of Cornouailles); the modern Diocese includes the former Diocese of Cornouailles, St-Pol-de-Leon and parts of Treguier
Bishop of St Brieuc and Trequier - Diocese of Saint-Brieuc and Tréguier
Bishop of Vannes- Diocese of Vannes - the modern diocese covers the Morbihan

History of Brittany